Yubileynoye is a rural locality (a selo) in Beloyarovsky Selsoviet of Mazanovsky District, Amur Oblast, Russia. The population was 90 as of 2018. There are 3 streets.

Geography 
Yubileynoye is located on the left bank of the Kamenushka River, 18 km south of Novokiyevsky Uval (the district's administrative centre) by road. Khristinovka is the nearest rural locality.

References 

Rural localities in Mazanovsky District